Karate has been a part of the Pan American Games since the 1995 Pan American Games in Mar del Plata, Argentina. There were eleven events, for both men (seven) and women (four), in this inaugural Pan Am event.

Medal table
Updated until 2019 edition.

References

 
Sports at the Pan American Games
Pan American Games